Farab (also Romanized as Fārāb) is a village in Sanjabad-e Gharbi Rural District, in the Central District of Kowsar County, Ardabil Province, Iran. At the 2006 census, its population was 650, in 138 families.

References 

Tageo

Towns and villages in Kowsar County